Jessie Nathaniel Lemonier (January 31, 1997 – January 26, 2023) was an American football outside linebacker. He played for the Los Angeles Chargers and the Detroit Lions of the National Football League (NFL), and the Birmingham Stallions of the United States Football League (USFL). He was signed by the Chargers as an undrafted free agent in 2020 following his college football career with the Liberty Flames.

Professional career

Los Angeles Chargers
Lemonier signed with the Los Angeles Chargers as an undrafted free agent following the 2020 NFL Draft on April 26, 2020. He was waived during final roster cuts on September 5, 2020, and signed to the team's practice squad the next day. He was promoted to the active roster on September 26, 2020, waived on October 24, 2020, and re-signed to the practice squad four days later. He was promoted back to the active roster on November 7, waived on November 28, 2020, and re-signed to the practice squad four days later. He was elevated to the active roster on December 17 for the team's week 15 game against the Las Vegas Raiders, and reverted back to the practice squad after the game. He was signed to the active roster on December 26, 2020.

On August 31, 2021, Lemonier was waived by the Chargers.

Detroit Lions
On September 2, 2021, Lemonier was signed to the Detroit Lions practice squad, promoted to the active roster on October 6, and waived on May 16, 2022.

Arizona Cardinals
On May 17, 2022, Lemonier was claimed off waivers by the Arizona Cardinals and released on August 17.

Birmingham Stallions
Lemonier was selected by the Arlington Renegades in the 2023 XFL Draft, but instead signed with the Houston Gamblers of the USFL on December 31, 2022. His playing rights were immediately traded to the Birmingham Stallions.

Death
On January 26, 2023, Lemonier died at the age of 25. Lemonier and his girlfriend were expecting their first child at the time of his death.

References

External links
 Los Angeles Chargers bio
 Liberty Flames football bio

1997 births
2023 deaths
People from Hialeah, Florida
Players of American football from Florida
Sportspeople from Miami-Dade County, Florida
American football defensive ends
American football outside linebackers
Liberty Flames football players
Los Angeles Chargers players
Detroit Lions players
Arizona Cardinals players
Houston Gamblers (2022) players
Birmingham Stallions (2022) players